is a Japanese idol singer and songwriter currently associated with Toy's Factory. She has released five major albums charting on Oricon's Top 100. She calls herself a “track maker idol with playing guitar”. She is also the chairperson of Kaishaja Naimon Co., Ltd (Not Company). Fans call her Chi-chan.

Biography 
Since Chiaki's father was from Okinawa, Japan, she liked to sing Okinawan music and dance to it in her childhood. She was influenced by South Korean pop group TVXQ, and originally dreamed of being a singer in 8th grade.

Though initially having plans to enter nursing school after graduation, she was further influenced by South Korean singer BoA, and ultimately decided to study music instead.

At the recommendation of a vocal instructor, she joined the (defunct as of July 2016) idol group Star-Bright★REX under the name Chiaki (Chī-chan).

On February 11, 2016, she began her solo career as Chiaki Mayumura (眉村ちあき), writing her own songs and holding concerts. At first, she sang with karaoke accompaniment, however, transitioned to acoustic guitar one month later.

On December 22, 2017, she held a press conference in Karasuyama Community Center, Tokyo, and she announced she registered and founded “Kaishaja Naimon Co., Ltd”. Since then, share certificates have been sold at her concerts.

On June 10, 2018, she appeared on a Japanese television program known as God Tongue (Goddotan・ゴッドタン), where she ad-libbed a song about vomit called Gero (ゲロ).

A staff member of Toy's Factory, a Japanese record label, was impressed by her performance. Under Toy's Factory, she released her debut album, "Mejameja Monja" on May 7, 2019.

Discography

Albums

Singles (Digital download only)

EPs (Digital download only)

DVD/Blu-ray

Filmography

References 
Notes

Sources

External links 

 Chiaki Mayumura profile at Oricon 

Japanese women singer-songwriters
Japanese singer-songwriters
Japanese women pop singers
21st-century Japanese singers
21st-century Japanese women singers
Japanese idols
Living people
1996 births